William Carol Latham (born August 29, 1960) is a former Major League Baseball pitcher. In  he joined the scouting staff of the Los Angeles Dodgers after six years as a professional scout for the Boston Red Sox.

External links

Major League Baseball pitchers
New York Mets players
Minnesota Twins players
Little Falls Mets players
Shelby Mets players
Lynchburg Mets players
Jackson Mets players
Tidewater Tides players
Toledo Mud Hens players
Portland Beavers players
St. Lucie Mets players
Baseball players from Birmingham, Alabama
Boston Red Sox scouts
Los Angeles Dodgers scouts
New York Mets scouts
1960 births
Living people